Henry Graybill Lamar (July 10, 1798 – September 10, 1861) was a United States Representative, lawyer and jurist from Georgia.

Lamar was born in Clinton, Georgia, in 1798. He studied law, gained admittance to the state bar and practiced law in Macon, Georgia. He served as a state superior court judge before being elected to the Georgia House of Representatives.

In 1828, Lamar was elected as a Jacksonian Representative from Georgia to the 21st United States Congress to fill the remainder of the term for the vacant seat resulting from the resignation of George Rockingham Gilmer. Lamar was reelected to the 22nd Congress and served in total from December 7, 1829, to March 3, 1833. He lost his reelection campaign for the 23rd Congress in 1832. Lamar also ran an unsuccessful Georgia gubernatorial campaign in 1857 and served as an associate justice of the Supreme Court of Georgia. He died in Macon on September 10, 1861, and was buried in Rose Hill Cemetery in that same city.

References

1798 births
1861 deaths
Georgia (U.S. state) lawyers
Georgia (U.S. state) state court judges
Members of the Georgia House of Representatives
Justices of the Supreme Court of Georgia (U.S. state)
Jacksonian members of the United States House of Representatives from Georgia (U.S. state)
19th-century American politicians
American slave owners
People from Macon, Georgia